The Vattanac Bank is a retail and commercial bank of Cambodia. It was founded in 2002 and is based in the capital Phnom Penh. , the bank has 13 branches, with eight in the capital and five in the provinces: Siem Reap, Battambang, Pursat, Takéo, and Kampong Speu. The bank also developed the Vattanac Capital, Cambodia's first skyscraper.

References

External links
 Vattanac Bank
 National Bank of Cambodia page 'Banks and Financial Institutions in Cambodia
Khmer Films International announces Vattanac Bank-financed documentary

Banks of Cambodia
Banks established in 2002
Cambodian companies established in 2002
Companies based in Phnom Penh